The Gokwe Region consists of the land in the area around Gokwe centre that was formerly under the control of the [Shangwe]language people, a Shona-speaking group, which lay in the northern part of the Midlands province of northwestern Zimbabwe, and is now broken up into Gokwe South District and Gokwe North District. A number of other groups live in the area, including the Tonga, and Ndebele.

Nkayi North District lies to the south. A researcher noted in 1998, that the Nkayi-Gokwe border had hardened even before independence when Shona-speaking auxiliary forces had been recruited in Gokwe and used against Nkayi in explicitly tribal attacks.

Notes

Geography of Midlands Province